Bill Cunningham New York is a 2010 American documentary film directed by Richard Press and produced by Philip Gefter. Bill Cunningham New York is distributed by Zeitgeist Films and was released in theaters on March 16, 2011.

Synopsis
"We all get dressed for Bill", says Vogue editor Anna Wintour. The Bill in question is The New York Times photographer Bill Cunningham. For decades, this Schwinn-riding cultural anthropologist has been obsessively and inventively chronicling fashion trends and high-society charity soirées for the Timess Style section in his columns "On the Street" and "Evening Hours".

Full of uptown fixtures (such as Wintour, Tom Wolfe, Brooke Astor, David Rockefeller—who all appear in the film), downtown eccentrics and everyone in between, Cunningham's enormous body of work documents its time and place as well as individual flair. Bill Cunningham New York portrays the man at work (on the street and at the office) and at home (a Carnegie Hall studio).

Cast
 Bill Cunningham
Editta Sherman
Carmen Dell'Orefice
Annette de la Renta
Anna Wintour
Iris Apfel
Shail Upadhya
Kim Hastreiter
Thelma Golden
Tom Wolfe
Brooke Astor
Mike Wallace
Michael Bloomberg
Catherine Deneuve
Anna Piaggi
Michael Kors
Arthur Ochs Sulzberger, Jr.

Awards
 2010: Opening Night Film New Directors/New Films Festival
 2010: Won Audience Award for Best Documentary Film at Sydney Film Festival
 2010: Won Best Documentary at Nantucket Film Festival
 2010: Won Best Documentary Audience Award at Melbourne International Film Festival
 2010: Won Best Documentary at Abu Dhabi International Film Festival

Release
Bill Cunningham New York played at New York City's Film Forum from March 16 to 29, 2011, before opening in theaters in a limited release around the United States.

Reviews
The film was critically well-received, garnering a 99% approval rating on movie review aggregator Rotten Tomatoes. The Hollywood Reporter described Bill Cunningham New York as a "Fascinating doc about a photographer surveying the highs and lows of New York society." New York Magazine chose Bill Cunningham New York as one of their Critics' Picks. Roger Ebert gave the film four out of four stars, writing "This movie made me happy every moment I was watching it." The film received a score of 76 on the aggregate website Metacritic indicating "generally favorable reviews".

References

External links
 
 
 

2010 in fashion
2010 documentary films
American documentary films
2010 directorial debut films
2010 films
Documentary films about photographers
Films about fashion in the United States
Films shot in New York City
2010s English-language films
2010s American films